Blakemore (also Lute Store) is an unincorporated community in Lonoke County, Arkansas, United States.

References

Unincorporated communities in Lonoke County, Arkansas
Unincorporated communities in Arkansas